Prospects is a British television comedy-drama series written by Alan Janes and originally released on Channel 4 in 1986. Created by Euston Films, who had a pedigree of producing successful, gritty dramas such as The Sweeney and Minder, it followed the exploits of two East End 'geezer' characters, Jimmy 'Pincy' Pince and Billy 'Bill' Pearson, played by Gary Olsen and Brian Bovell, respectively, and depicts their trials and tribulations of making a living in London's Isle of Dogs.

Comprising 12 episodes, Prospects was delivered with a comic slant and dealt with many of the major issues affecting British society at the height of the "Thatcherite" '80s including unemployment, crime, poverty, regeneration, social change, and racism.

The theme tune was written and composed by Ray Dorset. Although the vocals were meant to be sung by Roger Daltrey, the producers like Dorset's demo enough to offer him to do the vocals instead. 

The shows featured actors such as Ken Jones (Porridge) and Billy Hartman (Emmerdale).

Prospects gained a cult following and rating-wise it performed well above expectations for Channel 4. At that time Channel 4 received a large subsidy from the rival commercial network ITV in exchange for the right to sell airtime; this gave ITV significant input into the management of the station. The success of Prospects and the fact that it was produced by a subsidiary of the ITV network's largest station Thames Television meant it was moved to a 9 pm prime-time repeat slot on ITV in the Spring/Summer of 1987. This fuelled rumours that the network wanted to develop Prospects into a long-running comedy-drama series, but ITV declined the opportunity to develop it beyond the original first 12-episode series.

Cast

 Gary Olsen as Pincy
 Brian Bovell as Billy
 Peter Lovstrom as Mickey Smith
 Chrissie Cotterill as Mona
 Ben Howard as Halforth
 Mike Savage as Del
 Treva Etienne as Horace
 Eddie Tagoe as Stretch
 Nigel Davenport as The Governor
 John Benfield as Kev
 Peter Bayliss as Mr Frobisher
 Eve Bland as Maude
 John Forgeham as Jock
 Billy Hartman as Mr Innes
 John Hallam as Tubby Rawlinson
 Tony Haygarth as Alf
 Bernard Hepton as Hymie Peters
 Hazel O'Connor as Bev Reid
 Malcolm Tierney as Ralph Finchley
 Kate Williams as Bess
 Ken Jones as Mr Lambert
 Glen Murphy as Ron
 Ken Campbell as George
 Paul Mari as Slimey Keith

Episodes

DVD release
All 12 episodes were given an official Region 2, DVD release by Network on 25 March 2013.

References

External links
 
 Prospects at British Comedy Guide

Channel 4 original programming
1980s British comedy-drama television series
1986 British television series debuts
1986 British television series endings
Television shows set in London